Worksop North East is an electoral ward in the district of Bassetlaw. The ward elects 3 councillors to Bassetlaw District Council using the first past the post electoral system, with each councillor serving a four-year term in office. The number of registered voters in the ward is 4,946 as of 2019.

It consists of the Prospect, Thievesdale and Sunnyside areas of Worksop, between Blyth Road and Carlton Road.

The ward was created in 2002 following a review of electoral boundaries in Bassetlaw by the Boundary Committee for England.

Councillors

The ward elects 3 councillors every four years. Prior to 2015, Bassetlaw District Council was elected by thirds with elections taking place every year except the year in which elections to Nottinghamshire County Council took place.

Elections

2019

2015

2014

2012

2011

2011 by-election
A by-election was held on 10 February 2011 following the disqualification of Bill Graham (Conservative) due to non-attendance at council meetings.

2010

2008

2007

2006

2004

2003

2002

References

Wards of Nottinghamshire